Spessart is a municipality in the district of Ahrweiler, in Rhineland-Palatinate, Germany.

References

External links

 Reportage des SWR zur Themenwoche „Stadt, Land, Flucht“ – Landleben 4.0 in Spessart

Ahrweiler (district)